John Iremil Teodoro (born November 14, 1973 in Maybato Norte, San Jose de Buenavista, Antique, Philippines) is a Filipino writer, creative writing and literature teacher, literary critic, translator, and cultural scholar. He is also considered to be a leading pioneer in Philippine gay literature and the most published author in Kinaray-a.

About 

Born to a middle-class family in Antique province, Teodoro gained early recognition as a creative writer since his college years. His father is an international ship captain and his mother a full-time housewife. He writes in four languages, namely English, Filipino, Hiligaynon and Kinaray-a.

He is a member of the Alon Collective and the Tabig/Hubon Manunulat Antique. Many of his literary works have been published in some of the country's leading journals, magazines and newspapers like Ani, Idea, Tomas, Agung, The Daily Tribune, and Liwayway. His poems are also published and translated ito English by the State of Virginia Poet Laureate Luisa A. Igloria in international online literary journals like Qarrtsiluni and Plume Poetry.

Teodoro is a five-time awardee of the Palanca Awards and has published countless books of fiction and poetry. He obtained his bachelor's degree in biology from the University of San Agustin in Iloilo City and completed an MFA degree in creative writing and a PhD in Literature from the De La Salle University-Manila where he is now teaching creative writing, literature, and art appreciation since 2016. His new essays in Filipino can be read in his blog Pagmumuni-muni ni Putri Duyung (jieteodoro.com).

Literary career 

Among Teodoro's first distinctions were the Literature Grant of the Cultural Center of the Philippines and Gawad Ka Amado in 1993 for his early attempts in Filipino poetry. His first full-length play in Filipino Unang Ulan ng Mayo (The First Rain of May) won 2nd Place at the 1997 Don Carlos Palanca Memorial Awards for Literature. He later worked as a journalist for Bandillo ng Palawan-Edisyong Filipino in Puerto Princesa City, a publication devoted to environmental issues in the province of Palawan.

In 2001, he returned to Iloilo City and taught literature as an assistant professor at the University of San Agustin where he became the founding coordinator of the Fray Luis de Leon Creative Writing Institute, managing director of the University of San Agustin Publishing House and moderator of the student publications. He also initiated the establishment of the annual San Agustin Writers Workshop to promote creative writing in Western Visayas. He also edited SanAg Literary Journal, a journal primarily devoted to the new works of writers in or from Western Visayas writing in Aklanon, Hiligaynon, Kinaray-a, Filipino, and English.

His full-length play Belasyon, which dramatizes the country's diaspora, was staged at the Cultural Center of the Philippines in 2003 as part of the University of San Agustin Centennial Commission's activities. In 2004, he was recognized as one of the Outstanding Augustinians of the Century for his lifetime achievement in culture and the arts. His poetry book Kung ang Tula ay Pwedeng Pambili ng Lalake (If Poems Could Buy Men) was shortlisted for the 2006 Manila Critics Circle National Book Award.

On February 20, 2008, Unang Ulan ng Mayo (The First Rain of May) was premiered by the De La Salle University - Harlequin Theatre Guild at the Tanghalang Huseng Batute, Cultural Center of the Philippines. On October 9, 10 and 11, 2008, the play was re-staged by the guild at the College of Saint Benilde, School of Design and Arts, Black Box. In the same year, his essay collection Pagmumuni-muni at Pagtatalak ng Sirenang Nagpapanggap na Prinsesa (Thoughts and Angry Ramblings of a Siren Pretending to be a Princess) won the Manila Critics Circle National Book Award for creative non-fiction whereas shortly after, he was bestowed the Bugal kang Anitique (Pride of Antique) Award for Culture and the Arts from the Antique Provincial Government.

In 2015 he represented the Philippines to the ASEAN Literary Festival in Jakarta, Indonesia together with Philippine National Artist for Literature Virgilio Almario and Bicolano writer Kristian Sendon Cordero.

Teodoro was elected secretary general of Unyon ng mga Manunulat sa Pilipinas (UMPIL) or the Writers Union of the Philippines in 2017.

In 2019 Teodoro won the Southeast Asia or SEAWRITE Award from the Kingdom of Thailand.

References 

1973 births
Karay-a people
Filipino dramatists and playwrights
20th-century Filipino poets
English-language writers from the Philippines
Palanca Award recipients
People from Antique (province)
Visayan writers
Living people
People from Iloilo
De La Salle University alumni
21st-century Filipino poets
Filipino male poets
20th-century male writers
21st-century male writers